"Going!" is the twelfth single by Japanese boy band KAT-TUN. It was released on May 12, 2010 by their record label J-One Records. The title track was used as the theme song for the Nippon Television TV Show, Going! Sports & News, which is co-hosted by member Kazuya Kamenashi.

Single information
Twelfth single release from KAT-TUN including the song "Going!," theme song of a Japanese TV program, "Going! Sports & News." Regular edition includes a bonus track "Fall Down" and two karaoke tracks.  Limited edition A includes a bonus track "Smile" and a bonus DVD with a music video and making-of footage of the single. Limited edition B includes two bonus tracks "I don't miss U" (Koki Tanaka solo) and "Answer" (Yuichi Nakamaru solo). Features alternate jacket artwork.

Chart performance
In its first week of its release, the single topped the Oricon singles chart, reportedly selling 230,452 copies. KAT-TUN gained their twelfth consecutive number one single on the Oricon Weekly Singles Chart since their debut and continued to hold the second most consecutive number one singles since debut with fellow Johnny's group, NEWS.

By the end of the year, Going! was reported by Oricon to sell 283,168 copies  and was later certified Platinum by RIAJ denoting over 250,000 shipments.

Track listing

Sales and certifications

References

External links
 "Going!" product information 

KAT-TUN songs
2010 singles
Oricon Weekly number-one singles
Billboard Japan Hot 100 number-one singles
2010 songs
Songs written by Koki Tanaka